FF Norden 02 Weiswampach-Hupperdange is an association football club based in the Weiswampach, in northern Luxembourg. As of the 2011–12 season, they play in the Luxembourg Division of Honour, the second tier of football in the country. The club was founded in 2002 as the amalgamation of FC Les Montagnards Weiswampach and FC Blo-Giel-Hupperdange.

References
Club profile at the Luxembourg Football Federation
Club history  by weltfootballarchiv.com

Football clubs in Luxembourg
Association football clubs established in 2002
2002 establishments in Luxembourg